|}
{| class="collapsible collapsed" cellpadding="0" cellspacing="0" style="clear:right; float:right; text-align:center; font-weight:bold;" width="280px"
! colspan="3" style="border:1px solid black; background-color: #77DD77;" | Also Ran

The 1994 Epsom Derby was a horse race which took place at Epsom Downs on Wednesday 1 June 1994. It was the 215th running of the Derby, and it was won by the pre-race favourite Erhaab. The winner was ridden by Willie Carson and trained by John Dunlop.

Race details
 Sponsor: Ever Ready
 Winner's prize money: £473,080
 Going: Good
 Number of runners: 25
 Winner's time: 2m 34.16s

Full result

* The distances between the horses are shown in lengths or shorter. shd = short-head; hd = head; nk = neck; UR = unseated rider.† Trainers are based in Great Britain unless indicated.

Winner's details
Further details of the winner, Erhaab:

 Foaled: 24 May 1991, in Kentucky, US
 Sire: Chief's Crown; Dam: Histoire (Riverman)
 Owner: Hamdan Al Maktoum
 Breeder: Shadwell Farm
 Rating in 1994 International Classifications: 126

Form analysis

Two-year-old races
Notable runs by the future Derby participants as two-year-olds in 1993.

 Erhaab – 3rd Horris Hill Stakes
 King's Theatre – 1st Haynes, Hanson and Clark Stakes, 1st Racing Post Trophy
 Colonel Collins – 1st Washington Singer Stakes, 2nd Somerville Tattersall Stakes
 Mister Baileys – 1st Vintage Stakes, 6th Gimcrack Stakes, 1st Royal Lodge Stakes
 Khamaseen – 3rd Haynes, Hanson and Clark Stakes, 4th Racing Post Trophy
 Just Happy – 2nd Acomb Stakes
 Star Selection – 2nd Haynes, Hanson and Clark Stakes
 Wishing – 6th Royal Lodge Stakes
 Party Season – 4th Royal Lodge Stakes
 Chickawicka – 3rd Woodcote Stakes, 7th Chesham Stakes, 5th Racing Post Trophy
 Sunshack – 2nd Prix La Rochette, 3rd Prix de Condé, 1st Critérium de Saint-Cloud
 The Flying Phantom – 2nd Silver Tankard Stakes, 5th Zetland Stakes

The road to Epsom
Early-season appearances in 1994 and trial races prior to running in the Derby.

 Erhaab – 2nd Feilden Stakes, 1st Dante Stakes
 King's Theatre – 1st Craven Stakes, 13th 2,000 Guineas, 4th Dante Stakes
 Colonel Collins – 2nd Craven Stakes, 3rd 2,000 Guineas
 Mister Baileys – 1st 2,000 Guineas, 3rd Dante Stakes
 Khamaseen – 2nd Sandown Classic Trial
 Pencader – 7th Dante Stakes
 Just Happy – 1st Thirsk Classic Trial, 8th 2,000 Guineas
 Star Selection – 6th 2,000 Guineas
 Linney Head – 1st Sandown Classic Trial
 Ionio – 6th Newmarket Stakes
 Chocolat de Meguro – 2nd Lingfield Derby Trial
 Weigh Anchor – 3rd Feilden Stakes, 2nd Dante Stakes
 Wishing – 3rd Lingfield Derby Trial
 Party Season – 5th Dante Stakes
 Waiting – 2nd Dee Stakes
 Chickawicka – 5th Dee Stakes
 Sunshack – 3rd Prix Hocquart
 The Flying Phantom – 6th Easter Stakes, 4th Chester Vase
 Broadway Flyer – 1st Chester Vase
 Darkwood Bay – 5th Predominate Stakes
 Colonel Colt – 5th Glasgow Stakes
 Foyer – 1st Glasgow Stakes

Subsequent Group 1 wins
Group 1 / Grade I victories after running in the Derby.

 King's Theatre – King George VI and Queen Elizabeth Stakes (1994)
 Sunshack – Prix Royal-Oak (1995)
 Broadway Flyer – Sword Dancer Invitational Handicap (1996)

Subsequent breeding careers
Leading progeny of participants in the 1994 Epsom Derby.

Sires of National Hunt horses
King's Theatre (2nd)
 Cue Card - 1st Betfair Chase (2013, 2015, 2016), 1st Ascot Chase (2013, 2017), 1st King George VI Chase (2015)
 The New One - 1st Aintree Hurdle (2014), 1st Baring Bingham Novices' Hurdle (2013)
 Menorah - 1st Supreme Novices' Hurdle (2010), 1st Manifesto Novices' Chase (2012)
 Fashionista - Dam of Bobs Worth (1st Cheltenham Gold Cup 2013)
Mister Baileys (4th) - Exported to America before standing in England
 Blazing Bailey - 1st World Series Hurdle (2008)
Sunshack (19th)
 Bambi du Rheu - 3rd Prix des Drags (2010)
 Sundahia - 5th Prix des Drags (2013)
Broadway Flyer (21st) 
 Broadway Buffalo - 1st Tommy Whittle Chase (2014)
 Charminster - 3rd Lonesome Glory Hurdle (2016)
 Bay Pearl - Dam of Slate House (1st Kauto Star Novices' Chase 2019)

Other Stallions
Colonel Collins (3rd) - Sired useful jumps handicappers - Damsire of Frederick Engels (1st July Stakes 2011)Erhaab (1st) - Exported to Japan - Returned to England - Sired minor winnersKhamaseen (5th) - Exported to AmericaPencader	 (6th) - Exported to ChileJust Happy (8th) - Exported to South AfricaLinney Head (10th) - Exported to South AfricaChocolat de Meguro (12th) - Minor jumps winnerWaiting (17th) - Exported to Saudi ArabiaChickawicka (18th) - Sired moderate jumps runnerDarkwood Bay (22nd) - Sired minor runnersFoyer (Unseated rider) - Exported to India

References

External links
 Colour Chart – Derby 1994

Epsom Derby
 1994
Epsom Derby
1994 in British sport
20th century in Surrey